The 2021 Austin Bold FC season was the club's third season of existence and their third in the USL Championship, the second tier of American soccer.

Roster

Competitions

Exhibitions

USL Championship

Standings — Central Division

Results summary

Results by round

Match results
The team's schedule was announced on March 30 featuring 32 matches, 16 at home and 16 away.

Statistics

Appearances and goals

Disciplinary record

Clean sheets

See also
 Austin Bold FC
 2021 in American soccer
 2021 USL Championship season

References

Austin Bold
Austin Bold
Austin Bold
Austin Bold FC